was a famous Japanese modern painter of the Nihonga style of watercolour painting. His original name was Yoshizō (義三). The name Togyū referred to a poem from his father who ran a publishing business.

Okumura is characterized by his works which achieve unusual, exquisite quality of colours through the application of the white gofun pigment 100 or 200 times as foundation.

Biography 
1889 Born in Kyōbashi, Tokyo.
1900 Completes shogakko (junior school).

1926 Makes the acquaintance of Hayami Gyoshu.

1959 Becomes a director of the Japanese fine arts institute.
1962 Awarded the Japanese Order of Culture.
1978 Appointed chief director of the Japanese fine arts institute.

1990 Dies aged 101.

Major works
He painted Mount Fuji, which is in the Tokyo Imperial Palace.

鳴門 （1959, 128.5×160.5 cm）
鹿 （1968,　114.7×145.0 cm）
醍醐 （1972,　135.5×115.8 cm）
閑日 （1974,　73.0×100.0 cm）
吉野 （1977,　108.6×184.4 cm）
富士宮の富士 （1982,　76.1×115.1 cm）
蠣 （1984,　102.0×131.0 cm）
寅 （1985,　16.2×49.5 cm）

Books and collections of work
スケッチそのをりをり （collection of sketches, 1917）
牛のあゆみ （autobiography, 1974）

Major collections holding works by Okumura
Okumura Togyu Memorial Museum (Nagano prefecture)
Yamatane Museum

See also 
 Kaii Higashiyama
 Seison Maeda

References

 Japanese arts, what & where? Tatsuo Takayama - 1987

1889 births
1990 deaths
Japanese centenarians
Men centenarians
Nihonga painters
Artists from Tokyo
Recipients of the Order of Culture
20th-century Japanese painters